Glen Murphy (born 1957) is a British actor and producer.

Glen or Glenn Murphy may also refer to:

 Glen Murphy (rugby league) (born 1971), Australian rugby league footballer
 Glen Murphy (Pulse), part of the duo Twist and Pulse
 Glenn Murphy (footballer) (born 1949), Australian rules footballer  
 Glenn Murphy, British children's author